Cafés Baqué was a Spanish cycling team established in 2003 and disbanded in 2004.

Major wins
2003
Stage 3 Volta a Catalunya, Aitor Kintana
2004
Stage 4 Vuelta Ciclista a la Comunidad Valenciana, Jorge Garcia Marín
Stage 17 Vuelta a España, Félix Rafael Cardenas

References

UCI Continental Teams (Europe)
Cycling teams established in 2003
Cycling teams disestablished in 2004
Cycling teams based in Spain